Wendy Anne Askew (née Bushby; formerly Summers; born 16 March 1963) is an Australian politician who is a Senator for Tasmania, representing the Liberal Party. She was appointed to a casual vacancy on 6 March 2019 in place of her brother David Bushby.

Personal life
Askew was born in Launceston, Tasmania. Her father Max Bushby and brother David Bushby were also Liberal politicians. She was known as Wendy Summers until her marriage in September 2018.

Politics
Prior to entering politics, Askew worked in a variety of roles in the public and private sectors. She was general manager of the St Giles Society, a disability services provider, and also spent 20 years in the banking industry, including roles with Westpac and the Commonwealth Bank. She later worked as office manager to state MP Michael Ferguson and as an adviser to state MP Sarah Courtney and federal MP Andrew Nikolic. Immediately prior to her elevation to the Senate she was working as an adviser to federal education minister Dan Tehan.

Askew held various senior positions in the Tasmanian Liberals, serving on the state executive, as party treasurer, and as a senior vice-president of the party. In 2018, it was reported that she would be a candidate for Senate preselection for the 2019 federal election.

Senate
Askew's brother David Bushby announced his retirement from the Senate in January 2019. She subsequently defeated seven other candidates to become the Liberal Party's nominee for the casual vacancy caused by his resignation. She will serve the remainder of his six-year term, which expires in June 2022. Askew was temporarily appointed to the Senate on 6 March 2019 by state governor Kate Warner under the provisions of section 15 of the constitution, as the state parliament was not in session. A joint sitting of the state parliament on 20 March 2019 formalised her appointment to the Senate.

Askew is the fourth woman to represent the Tasmanian Liberals in federal parliament and the first since Jocelyn Newman retired in 2002.

After the Coalition's defeat at the 2022 federal election, Askew was appointed Chief Opposition Whip in the Senate.

References

1963 births
Liberal Party of Australia members of the Parliament of Australia
Members of the Australian Senate
Members of the Australian Senate for Tasmania
Women members of the Australian Senate
Living people
Politicians from Launceston, Tasmania